Elaphoglossum tovii  is a species of plant discovered by E. Brown, it belongs to the genus Elaphoglossum and the family Dryopteridaceae. No subspecies are listed. It is native to the Marquesas Islands.

References

Dryopteridaceae